Poblacht na hÉireann is an Irish-language phrase which may refer to:
The revolutionary Irish Republic proclaimed in 1916 and 1919, also termed Saorstát Éireann
A newspaper first published in 1922 in Ireland by republican opponents of the Anglo-Irish Treaty
The Republic of Ireland, the legal description since 1949 of the modern sovereign state

See also 
Poblacht (disambiguation)
Names of the Irish state